The 2013 Bandy World Championship was an edition of the top annual event in international bandy, held between January 23 and February 3, 2013, in Norway and Sweden.

14 countries participated in the 2013 championships: Belarus, Finland, Kazakhstan, Norway, Russia, Sweden  (group A),  Canada, Estonia, Japan, Hungary, Latvia, the Netherlands, Ukraine and the United States (group B). The B-group Championship was played in Sapa Arena in Vetlanda. The B-Group games were only played 2x30 minutes.

Venues

Participating teams

Division A

Division B

Division A

Preliminary round 

All times local (UTC+1)

Match for fifth place

Knockout stage

Semi-finals

Match for third place

Final

Final standings

Statistics

Goalscorers
21 goals

  Patrik Nilsson

16 goals

  Igor Larionov

12 goals

  Daniel Andersson
  Vyacheslav Bronnikov
  Yevgeny Ivanushkin

10 goals

  Sami Laakkonen
  Pavel Ryazantsev

9 goals

  Sergey Pochkunov

8 goals

  Johan Esplund
  Johan Löfstedt

Division B

Group 1 
Note - Matches were of 60 minutes duration rather than the standard 90 minutes in Group A.

All times local (UTC+1)

Group 2 
Note - Matches were of 60 minutes duration rather than the standard 90 minutes in Group A.

All times local (UTC+1)

Knockout phase

Final tour

Match for seventh place

Quarterfinals

Semifinals

Match for fifth place

Match for third place

Final

Final standings

The USA will replace Belarus in group A next year.

References

External links
 Sweden - Russia game on 2013.01.31, Youtube with Russian commentators (the game starts about 6:50 in)

Bandy
Bandy
2013
International bandy competitions hosted by Norway
International bandy competitions hosted by Sweden
2013 in bandy
Bandy
Bandy
Bandy
Bandy
Bandy
Bandy
Sports competitions in Trollhättan
Sport in Vetlanda